Vincent Robert "Putter" Petrino (April 18, 1937 – July 26, 2018) was an American football coach. He served as the head football coach at Carroll College in Helena, Montana from 1971 to 1998, compiling record of 163–90–2.

A native of Butte, Montana, Petrino graduated from Butte Central Catholic High School in 1955.  He then attended Western Montana College—now known as University of Montana Western—in Dillon, Montana, where played college football as a halfback, before graduating with bachelor's degree in physical education in 1959. Petrino began his coaching career at Grass Range High School in Grass Range, Montana, where as head football coach he led his team to two district championships in three years.

Petrino's sons, Bobby and Paul Petrino, each played college football as a quarterback for their father at Carroll and went on to coaching careers. Petrino died on July 26, 2018, at his home in Helena.

Head coaching record

College football

References

1937 births
2018 deaths
American football halfbacks
Carroll Fighting Saints football coaches
Montana Western Bulldogs football players
High school basketball coaches in Montana
High school football coaches in Montana
People from Butte, Montana
Players of American football from Montana